"She" is a 1967 Australian television play. It was a filmed ballet set in an Antarctic base. It screened as part of Wednesday Theatre.

It was written especially for the ABC. It was choreographed by Spanish choreographer Juan Corelli. Correli says he was inspired by the music of Italian composer Luciano Chailly. "After listening to the music I had the idea of a fantasy set in Antarctica," he said. "It is something that could only be produced on television."

It starred Elke Neidhardt and was directed by Christopher Muir who was her husband.

Cast
 Gerard Sibrit
 Elke Neidhardt

References

1967 television plays
1967 Australian television episodes
1960s Australian television plays
Australian television plays based on ballets
Wednesday Theatre (season 3) episodes